Vincent James Sinisi (born November 7, 1981) is an Italian-American former baseball player who played internationally for the Italy national baseball team in 2006.

Biography
A native of Houston, Texas, Sinisi attended The Woodlands High School and Rice University, where he played college baseball for the Rice Owls. In 2002, Sinisi was named the Western Athletic Conference's baseball player of the year. That year, he also played collegiate summer baseball with the Falmouth Commodores of the Cape Cod Baseball League. 

The Texas Rangers selected Sinisi in the second round of the 2003 MLB draft. On May 11, 2006, the Rangers traded Sinisi and John Hudgins to the San Diego Padres for Freddy Guzmán and César Rojas.

References

1981 births
Living people
Italian baseball players
Rice Owls baseball players
Falmouth Commodores players
Stockton Ports players
Bakersfield Blaze players
Frisco RoughRiders players
Oklahoma RedHawks players
Mobile BayBears players
Peoria Saguaros players
Portland Beavers players
Leones del Escogido players
American expatriate baseball players in the Dominican Republic
Gigantes del Cibao players